The 2011 FIA WTCC Race of the Czech Republic (formally the 2011 FIA WTCC Monroe Race of the Czech Republic) was the fifth round of the 2011 World Touring Car Championship season and the sixth running of the FIA WTCC Race of the Czech Republic. It was held on 19 June 2011 at the Masaryk Circuit in Brno, Czech Republic.

Both races were won by Chevrolet RML with Robert Huff winning race one and Yvan Muller winning race two.

Background
After the previous round, Huff was leading the drivers' championship. Kristian Poulsen was tied on points at the top of the Yokohama Independents' Trophy with Javier Villa.

Gabriele Tarquini and Tiago Monteiro became the next two SUNRED Engineering drivers to switch to the new 1.6T engine. Polestar Racing also switched to their own turbo engine in the Volvo C30 driven by Robert Dahlgren.

Report

Free practice
Muller led the opening free practice session with Huff and Alain Menu behind making it a Chevrolet 1–2–3. Norbert Michelisz in fourth was the fastest independent runner and Dahlgren was fifth with the new turbocharged Volvo. Michel Nykjær was the fastest SUNRED driver.

Muller, Huff and Menu finished the second free practice session in the same order as Chevrolet continued to dominate practice. Dahlgren was fourth in the Volvo and Tom Coronel was fifth in the leading BMW. Tarquini was the quickest SUNRED car in sixth but teammate Monteiro didn't set a competitive lap time during the session having suffered from a misfiring engine.

Qualifying
Muller took his first pole position of the season with him and team–mate Huff locking out the front row for Chevrolet. Dahlgren had been fastest in the first segment of qualifying with Huff second and Muller third. Franz Engstler ended the session tenth and would therefore take the reversed grid pole position for race two, lining up alongside Coronel. SUNRED drivers Tiago Monteiro and Fredy Barth suffered turbo problems in their cars and did not set any competitive times during the session.

In Q2, Muller set the fastest time and Huff was second. Coronel in third separated Menu in fourth from the other two Chevrolets. Michelisz, Dahlgren, Poulsen, Tarquini, Darryl O'Young and Engstler rounded out the top ten.

Michelisz later excluded from qualifying when his Zengő-Dension Team car was found to be underweight. This promoted Nykjær to tenth in Q1 and therefore pole position in race two.

Warm-Up
Muller was quickest in the warm–up session on Sunday morning, the pole sitter edging out Dahlgren's Volvo by less than a tenth of a second.

Race One
Muller led the rolling start but Huff made an attempt to take the lead at the first corner. Huff failed to do so but his second attempt at turn seven saw him lead the race. Nykjær and Tarquini made contact at the first corner with Tarquini retiring due to the subsequent damage. Coronel in third was busy keeping Menu behind until three laps from the end when the Chevrolet driver outbraked Coronel for third place with three laps to go. At the end of the race, championship leader Huff led a Chevrolet 1–2–3 with Coronel ending up fourth ahead of independent winner Poulsen. Dahlgren was sixth and O'Young came out on top in the battle for seventh place ahead of Michelisz who came from the back to eighth. Villa and Nykjær completed the top ten while Monteiro continued to struggle and ended up twelfth.

Race Two
Nykjær started on pole position for race two but was quickly passed by the fast starting Coronel who led into the first corner. Muller had made a good start from eighth and took second place from Nykjær at turn eight. Two laps later, Muller had closed in on Coronel and passed the ROAL Motorsport driver. Coronel then made contact with Menu defending second place while Huff was behind the pair in fourth place. Further back, Tarquini and Poulsen battled over position further down the field which ended with Poulsen going through the gravel trap at turn five. Tarquini fell down to sixth and Poulsen recovered to eighth at the end. At the end of the race, Muller claimed the win with Coronel second and Menu third. Race one winner Huff was fourth ahead of race two pole sitter and Yokohama Trophy winner Nykjær. Tarquini, Villa, Poulsen, Dahlgren and Mehdi Bennani completed the top ten.

Results

Qualifying

Bold denotes Pole position for second race.

 — Michelisz was excluded from qualifying after his car was found to be underweight after the session.

Race 1

Bold denotes Fastest lap.

Race 2

Bold denotes Fastest lap.

Standings after the event

Drivers' Championship standings

Yokohama Independents' Trophy standings

Manufacturers' Championship standings

 Note: Only the top five positions are included for both sets of drivers' standings.

References

External links
World Touring Car Championship official website

Czech Republic
2011 in Czech sport